Decker Dean (born 8 August 2000) is an American ski jumper.

Career 
He made his world cup debut in the 2019/20 season. His best result is 2nd place from the Continental Cup event in Willingen 2020. He set his personal best at 188.5 metres (618 ft) in Planica world championships.

In January 2022, USA Nordic nominated him to be a member of the US Olympic Team in ski jumping for the February 2022 Olympic Games in Beijing. It was his first Olympics.

World Cup

Standings

Individual starts (12)

References

External links 

2000 births
Living people
American male ski jumpers
Place of birth missing (living people)
Sportspeople from Colorado
Ski jumpers at the 2022 Winter Olympics
Olympic ski jumpers of the United States